Now 06 is a compilation CD released under EMI Music Australia in 2004.

Track listing
 Widelife with Simone Denny – "All Things (Just Keep Getting Better)" (2:46)
 Chingy featuring J-Weav – "One Call Away" (4:19)
 Kylie Minogue – "Chocolate" (4:00)
 Kelis – "Trick Me" (3:27)
 Simple Plan – "Perfect" (4:39)
 Jamelia – "Thank You" (3:15)
 J-Wess featuring Kulaia and Digga – "Luv Ya" (4:23)
 Jet – "Look What You've Done" (3:52)
 LMC vs. U2 – "Take Me to the Clouds Above" (2:51)
 N.E.R.D – "She Wants to Move" (3:34)
 Scribe featuring Savage and Con Psy – "Not Many – The Remix!" (3:46)
 Starsailor – "Four to the Floor" (Thin White Duke Mix) (4:36)
 Michael Bublé – "Sway" (Junkie XL Mix) (3:09)
 Thirsty Merc – "Emancipate Myself" (4:11)
 Basement Jaxx featuring JC Chasez – "Plug It In" (3:18)
 Eskimo Joe – "From the Sea" (3:23)
 Boogie Pimps – "Sunny" (2:59)
 The Darkness – "I Believe in a Thing Called Love" (3:39)
 The Streets – "Fit but You Know It" (4:13)
 The Vines – "Ride" (2:38)
 Cristian Alexanda – "Misunderstood" (3:39)
 The Corrs – "Summer Sunshine" (2:52)

References
Now 06 Track List

2004 compilation albums
EMI Records compilation albums
Now That's What I Call Music! albums (Australian series)